Forbidden Fruit is a 1952 French drama film directed by Henri Verneuil and starring Fernandel, Françoise Arnoul and Claude Nollier. Drawn from the novel Act of Passion (Lettre à mon juge) by Georges Simenon, it omits the book's grim resolution and instead invents a happy ending. The story it tells is of a doctor in a provincial city with a devoted wife and children who falls for a sexy but transient young woman and then loses her before his domestic and professional life are both ruined.

It was shot at the Saint-Maurice Studios in Paris. The film's sets were designed by the art director Rino Mondellini.

Plot
Left a widower with two small daughters who are looked after by his widowed mother, Dr Pellegrin is a general practitioner in the city of Arles. At a party he sees a handsome and assured widow, Armande, who decides to be his next wife. Though she capably takes over his house, his children and the administration of his practice, the relationship lacks passion. He meets a forward young woman, Martine, who has come to Arles to find work, and after an evening's drinking spends the night with her in a hotel.

Under a transparent story of her being referred to him as a patient, he introduces her into his house. Armande is sympathetic to the girl and suggests that she can work as Pellegrin's assistant, the pay enabling her to live in lodgings. Amid the constraints of his job and his marriage, Pellegrin snatches moments with Martine when he can, but if she has a drink or a dance with anyone else he becomes insanely jealous.

Unable to take the strain of this artificial life with no future, in a strange town where everybody knows the doctor and where his wife must by now know all, Martine decides to get out. Pellegrin rushes home to pack a bag and join her, but cannot find her at the railway station. Walking home despondent, he sees her say goodbye to a man in a bar and get on a bus. Shattered, he returns to his welcoming wife.

Cast
 Fernandel as Dr. Charles Pellegrin
 Françoise Arnoul as Martine Englebert
 Claude Nollier as Armande Barthelémy, the doctor's second wife
 Jacques Castelot as Boquet, owner of a bar
 René Génin as Dr. Marchandeau
 Fernand Sardou as Fontvielle
 Jackie Sardou as The boy's mother

References

External links

1952 films
1952 drama films
French black-and-white films
Films based on Belgian novels
Films based on works by Georges Simenon
Films directed by Henri Verneuil
Adultery in films
French drama films
1950s French films